The 13th House of Representatives of Zanzibar is the current legislature of Zanzibar following the 2016 general election of representatives of the Zanzibar House of Representatives.

Graphical representation
The House of Representatives has a total of 88. This includes the 54 directly contested parliamentary constituencies.

List of MPs elected in the general election

Directly Elected

Special Seats

Presidential Appointees

See also
List of MPs elected in the 2015 Tanzania general election

References

External links 
 Zanzibar Assembly
 Zanzibar Election Commission

Zanzibar general election 2016
Representatives elected in the 2016 election